Edward Drew was an Anglican  priest in England during the  late 17th and early 18th centuries.

Drew was born in Devon and educated at Exeter College, Oxford.  He held livings at Lezant and Bridestowe. He became a Canon of Exeter Cathedral in 1671 and Archdeacon of Cornwall from 1633 to 1667.
 He died on 17 December 1714.

References 

Alumni of Emmanuel College, Cambridge
Alumni of Exeter College, Oxford
17th-century English Anglican priests
18th-century English Anglican priests
Archdeacons of Cornwall
Exeter Cathedral
1714 deaths